Bishnu Charan Das (9 October 1954 – 6 July 2020) was an Indian politician from the state of Odisha. He was a leader of the Biju Janata Dal and had previously contested seats in Odisha Legislative Assembly from Jagatsinghpur seat.

In 2016, he was the candidate of the party for the biennial Rajya Sabha elections. He was elected unopposed with Prasanna Acharya and N. Bhaskar Rao.

He resigned from Rajya Sabha on 21 March 2017 after being appointed deputy chairman of Odisha State Planning Board.

He died at a hospital in Bhubaneswar on 6 July 2020, weeks after he suffered a stroke.

References

Rajya Sabha members from Odisha
Biju Janata Dal politicians
Odisha MLAs 2019–2024
1954 births
2020 deaths
Place of birth missing